Gentianella polyantha is a species of plant in the Gentianaceae family. It is endemic to Ecuador.  Its natural habitat is subtropical or tropical high-altitude grassland.

References

Endemic flora of Ecuador
polyantha
Endangered plants
Taxonomy articles created by Polbot